Acetoacetic ester synthesis is a chemical reaction where ethyl acetoacetate is alkylated at the α-carbon to both carbonyl groups and then converted into a ketone, or more specifically an α-substituted acetone. This is very similar to malonic ester synthesis.

Mechanism
A strong base deprotonates the dicarbonyl α-carbon.  This carbon is preferred over the methyl carbon because the formed enolate is conjugated and thus resonance stabilized.  The carbon then undergoes nucleophilic substitution.  When heated with aqueous acid, the newly alkylated ester is hydrolyzed to a β-keto acid, which is decarboxylated to form a methyl ketone.

Double deprotonation of ethyl acetoacetate
The classical acetoacetatic ester synthesis utilizes the 1:1 conjugate base.  Ethyl acetoacetate is however diprotic:
CH3C(O)CH2CO2Et  +  NaH  →  CH3C(O)CH(Na)CO2Et  +  H2
CH3C(O)CH(Na)CO2Et  +  BuLi  →  LiCH2C(O)CH(Na)CO2Et  +  BuH

The dianion (i.e., LiCH2C(O)CH(Na)CO2Et) adds electrophile  to the terminal carbon as depicted in the following simplified form:
LiCH2C(O)CH(Na)CO2Et  +  RX  →  RCH2C(O)CH(Na)CO2Et  +  LiX

See also
 Malonic ester synthesis

References

Organic reactions
Carbon-carbon bond forming reactions